Mount Stromlo Observatory located just outside Canberra, Australia, is part of the Research School of Astronomy and Astrophysics at the Australian National University (ANU).

History
The observatory was established in 1924 as The Commonwealth Solar Observatory. The Mount Stromlo site had already been used for observations in the previous decade, a small observatory being established there by Pietro Baracchi using the Oddie telescope located there in 1911. The dome built to house the Oddie telescope was the first Commonwealth building constructed in the newly established Australian Capital Territory. In 1911 a delegation for an Australian Solar Observatory went to London seeking Commonwealth assistance. The League of the Empire sought subscriptions to assist raising funds. Survey work to determine the site's suitability had begun as soon as the idea of a new Capital was established. By 1909 the Australian Association for the Advancement of Science was assisted in this effort by Hugh Mahon (Minister for Home Affairs). Until World War II, the observatory specialised in solar and atmospheric observations. During the war the workshops contributed to the war effort by producing gun sights, and other optical equipment.  After the war, the observatory shifted direction to stellar and galactic astronomy and was renamed The Commonwealth Observatory. Dr R. Wooley Director of the Observatory, worked to gain support for a larger reflector, arguing that the southern hemisphere should attempt to compete with the effectiveness of American telescopes. The ANU was established in 1946 in nearby Canberra and joint staff appointments and graduate studies were almost immediately undertaken. A formal amalgamation took place in 1957, with Mount Stromlo Observatory becoming part of the Department of Astronomy in the Research School of Physical Sciences at ANU, leading eventually to the formation of the Research School of Astronomy and Astrophysics in 1986.

On 18 January 2003, the devastating Canberra firestorm hit Mount Stromlo (which was surrounded by a plantation pine forest), destroying five telescopes, workshops, seven homes, and the heritage-listed administration building. The only telescope to escape the fires was the 1886 15-centimetre Farnham telescope. Relics from the fire are preserved in the collection of the National Museum of Australia. They include a melted telescope mirror and a piece of melted optical glass (flint). The latter has pieces of charcoal and wire fused into it from the fierce heat of the fire.

Redevelopment is completed and the Observatory is now a major partner in the construction of the Giant Magellan Telescope. The current observatory director is Matthew Colless.

The director's residence, destroyed in the 2003 fire, was rebuilt and opened to the public as a memorial in 2015.

Research
The MACHO project detected the first instance of the gravitational lensing of one star by another, known as gravitational microlensing, in 1993 (Alcock et al. 1993; Paczynski 1996). This discovery was made by repeated imaging of the Magellanic Clouds with the refurbished 50-inch Great Melbourne Telescope which was equipped with a mosaic of eight 2048 by 2048 pixel CCDs. The camera was constructed by the Centre for Particle Astrophysics in California (CFPA), and at the time was the largest digital camera ever built (Frame & Faulkner 2003).  Observations began in July 1992 and the project concluded in December 1999.  In total, the MACHO project made over 200 billion stellar measurements, with the
data processed both at the observatory and at the Lawrence Livermore National Laboratory.

Brian Schmidt organised an international collaboration, known as the High-z Supernova Search Team, to study the rate of change of the Cosmic Expansion using type Ia supernovae.  In 1998, the team reach the conclusion that the cosmic expansion was accelerating, contrary to expectations.  This universal acceleration implies the existence of dark energy and was named the top science breakthrough of 1998 by Science magazine. In 2011, Brian P. Schmidt shared the Nobel Prize in Physics with Saul Perlmutter and Adam Riess for such observations which provided evidence for the accelerating Universe.

The 2dF Galaxy Redshift Survey, co-led by Matthew Colless, undertook the largest galaxy redshift survey of its time, and was conducted at the Anglo-Australian Observatory (AAO) with the 3.9m Anglo-Australian Telescope between 1997 and 11 April 2002. In total, the survey measured more than 245,000 galaxies, providing, along with the Sloan Digital Sky Survey, the definitive measurements of large scale structure in the low-redshift Universe.

Advanced instrumentation
The instrumentation group at Mount Stromlo Observatory has built two instruments for the Gemini Telescope. This includes the near infrared integral field spectrometer, NIFS, deployed on Gemini-North, and the adaptive optics imager for Gemini-South, GSAOI. NIFS, when nearly completed, was destroyed in the bushfires of 18 January 2003, and rebuilt.

A new rapid survey telescope, SkyMapper, was completed in 2014. SkyMapper resides at the ANU's other observatory (Siding Spring) and can be operated remotely from Mount Stromlo.

Mount Stromlo hosts a DORIS (geodesy) earth station installed by France's CNES.

Location
Mount Stromlo Observatory is located at an altitude of 770 metres above sea level on Mount Stromlo. Situated west of the centre of Canberra, near the district of Weston Creek. Canberra's main water supply treatment plant is located nearby.

Engineering heritage award 
The observatory received an Engineering Heritage International Marker from Engineers Australia as part of its Engineering Heritage Recognition Program.

See also
 List of astronomical observatories
 Shrouds of the Night, 2007 by David Block and Ken Freeman

References

Further reading
R. Bhathal, R. Sutherland, & H. Butcher (2013), Mt Stromlo Observatory, CSIRO Publishing, Melbourne VIC,

Bibliography
Alcock, C. et al. 1993, Nature, 365(6447), 621-623Paczynski, B. 1996, Annu. Rev. Astro. Astrophys., 34(1), 419-459
Stromlo An Australian Observatory by Tom Frame and Don Faulkner, Allen and Unwin 1993,

External links

ANU Website
Research School of Astronomy and Astrophysics at the ANU
SkyMapper Website.
Mt. Stromlo. SLR Global Performance Report Card
Most important of all has been the scientific output of the Observatory

1924 establishments in Australia
Astronomical observatories in Australian Capital Territory
Australian National University
Buildings and structures in Canberra
Recipients of Engineers Australia engineering heritage markers